Connecticut's 12th House of Representatives district elects one member of the Connecticut House of Representatives. It encompasses part of Manchester. It has been represented by Democrat Geoff Luxenberg since 2019.

Recent Elections

2020

2018

2016

2014

2012

References

12